Bucculatrix parthenica is a moth of the family Bucculatricidae. It is native to Mexico, but was released in Queensland, Australia, as a biological control agent for Parthenium weeds. It was described by John David Bradley in 1990.

The wingspan is about 5 mm. Adults are white and brown.

The larvae feed on Parthenium hysterophorus. First and second instar larvae mine the leaf of their host plant, feeding on it from the inside and leaving the upper and lower skin intact. Later instars feed externally on the leaves. Pupation takes place in a white cocoon under a leaf or stem.

External links
Australian Faunal Directory
Australian Insects
Biology of Bucculatrix parthenica Bradley sp. n. (Lepidoptera: Bucculatricidae) and its establishment in Australia as a biological control agent for Parthenium hysterophorus (Asteraceae)

Moths of Queensland
Bucculatricidae
Moths described in 1990
Moths of Central America